Antonio Verini (30 June 1936 – 12 September 2021) was an Italian politician who served as a Deputy in 2006.

References

1936 births
2021 deaths
Christian Democracy (Italy) politicians
The Democrats (Italy) politicians
Democracy is Freedom – The Daisy politicians
Liberal Democrats (Italy) politicians
Deputies of Legislature XV of Italy
People from the Province of L'Aquila
Members of Italian regional councils